The 2007–08 English Hockey League season took place from September 2007 until April 2008. The league was sponsored by Slazenger and the men's title was won by Reading with the women's title going to Slough. There were no playoffs during the season.

The Men's Cup was won by Beeston and the Women's Cup was won by Leicester.

Men's Slazenger Premier Division League Standings 

 + deducted 2 points for fielding a de-registered player 
 * deducted 2 points for fielding an ineligible player

Results

Women's Slazenger Premier Division League Standings

Men's Cup

Quarter-finals

Semi-finals

Final 
(Held at the Highfields Sports Club, Nottingham on 18 May)

Women's Cup

Quarter-finals

Semi-finals

Final 
(Held at Highfields Sports Club, Nottingham on 18 May)

References 

England Hockey League seasons
field hockey
field hockey
England